ESPN NFL Football (alternatively known as NFL 2K4) is the first Sega football game using the ESPN in the name. It is published by Sega and developed by Visual Concepts. It was released for PlayStation 2 and Xbox. Former Tampa Bay Buccaneers defensive lineman Warren Sapp is featured on the cover.

Reception

The game received "universal acclaim" on both platforms according to the review aggregation website Metacritic. GameSpot named it the best Xbox game of September 2003.

References

External links
 

PlayStation 2 games
Xbox games
National Football League video games
2003 video games
Sega video games
Video games developed in the United States
ESPN NFL video games